Empire Block may refer to:

Empire Block (Pendleton, Oregon), listed on the National Register of Historic Places in Umatilla County, Oregon
Empire Block (Superior, Wisconsin), listed on the National Register of Historic Places in Douglas County, Wisconsin